Tai Po Hui is one of the 19 constituencies in the Tai Po District.

The constituency returns one district councillor to the Tai Po District Council, with an election every four years. The seat has been currently held by Lam Ming-yat of the TPDA.

Tai Po Hui constituency is loosely based on Tai Po Market (Tai Po Hui) with estimated population of 19,451.

Councillors represented

Election results

2010s

2000s

1990s

Notes

References

Tai Po
Constituencies of Hong Kong
Constituencies of Tai Po District Council
1994 establishments in Hong Kong
Constituencies established in 1994